XOX-Theater Kleve  is a theatre in Kleve, North Rhine-Westphalia, Germany.

Theatres in North Rhine-Westphalia